The Blue Mountains are a small mountain range on Ellesmere Island, Nunavut, Canada. It is a subrange of the Arctic Cordillera. The Blue Mountains contain Mesozoic stratigraphy.

See also
List of mountain ranges

Mountain ranges of Qikiqtaaluk Region
Arctic Cordillera